The 25th G8 Summit was held in Cologne, Germany, on June 18–20, 1999. The venue for this summit meeting was the Museum Ludwig in the central city.

Overview
The Group of Seven (G7) was an unofficial forum which brought together the heads of the richest industrialized countries: France, Germany, Italy, Japan, the United Kingdom, the United States, and Canada starting in 1976.  The G8, meeting for the first time in 1997, was formed with the addition of Russia. In addition, the President of the European Commission has been formally included in summits since 1981. The summits were not meant to be linked formally with wider international institutions; and in fact, a mild rebellion against the stiff formality of other international meetings was a part of the genesis of cooperation between France's president Valéry Giscard d'Estaing and West Germany's chancellor Helmut Schmidt as they conceived the initial summit of the Group of Six (G6) in 1975.

The G8 summits since the late 1990s have inspired widespread debates, protests and demonstrations; and the two- or three-day event becomes more than the sum of its parts, elevating the participants, the issues and the venue as focal points for activist pressure. In 1999, a global Carnival Against Capital was organised by Peoples' Global Action. 4,000 people rioted in the City of London.

Leaders at the summit
The G8 is an unofficial annual forum for the leaders of Canada, the European Commission, France, Germany, Italy, Japan, Russia, the United Kingdom, and the United States.

The 25th G8 summit was the first summit for German Chancellor Gerhard Schröder and was the last summit for Russian President Boris Yeltsin. It was also the first and only summit for Italian Prime Minister Massimo D'Alema and Japanese Prime Minister Keizō Obuchi.

Participants

These summit participants are the current "core members" of the international forum:

Priorities
Traditionally, the host country of the G8 summit sets the agenda for negotiations, which take place primarily amongst multi-national civil servants in the weeks before the summit itself, leading to a joint declaration which all countries can agree to sign.

Issues
The summit was intended as a venue for resolving differences among its members. As a practical matter, the summit was also conceived as an opportunity for its members to give each other mutual encouragement in the face of difficult economic decisions.

Business opportunity
For some, the G8 summit became a profit-generating event; as for example, the official G8 Summit magazines which have been published under the auspices of the host nations for distribution to all attendees since 1998.

Gallery

Notes

References
 Bayne, Nicholas and Robert D. Putnam. (2000).  Hanging in There: The G7 and G8 Summit in Maturity and Renewal. Aldershot, Hampshire, England: Ashgate Publishing. ; OCLC 43186692
 Reinalda, Bob and Bertjan Verbeek. (1998).  Autonomous Policy Making by International Organizations. London: Routledge.  ; ;   OCLC 39013643

External links
 Official G8 website: Cologne summit, 1999; n.b., no official website is created for any G7 summit prior to 1995 – see the 21st G7 summit.
 University of Toronto: G8 Research Group, G8 Information Centre
  G8 1999, delegations & documents

G8 summit
G8 summit
1999 in international relations
G8 summit 1999
G8 summit 1999
1999
G8 1999 summit
June 1999 events in Europe